Achonry is a village in County Sligo, Ireland.
The old name is Achad Cain Conairi. St. Nath Í ua hEadhra (O'Hara) founded a monastery here. The foundation gave the later diocese its name. The monastery was founded on land granted by the Clan Conaire. Nath Í was the teacher of St. Féichín of Ballysadare.

The diocese was co-extensive with the barony of Leyney (Luighne).

In the parish is the former Church of Ireland Cathedral of St Crumnathy, now deconsecrated. The title, Bishop of Achonry, takes its name from the village, and has been used by bishoprics in both the Roman Catholic Church and Church of Ireland.

See also
 List of towns and villages in Ireland

Notable people
 Feardorcha Ó Conaill (1876–1929), writer and former rector of Achonry.

References

External links

Official Website of Catholic Diocese of Achonry

Towns and villages in County Sligo